ICTUS is a Belgian orchestra, founded by  in 1994, specialising in contemporary classical music. It is based in Brussels where it is involved in frequent collaborations with the contemporary dance choreographer Anne Teresa De Keersmaeker.

The orchestra specialises in music written since 1950 with an emphasis on contemporary compositions.

Selected recordings
Oscar Bianchi: Matra, Cyprès, CYP4502 
Fausto Romitelli / Paolo Pachini: An Index of Metals, Cyprès, CYP5622
Georges Aperghis / Peter Szendy: Avis de Tempête, Cyprès, CYP5621
Fausto Romitelli: Professor Bad Trip, Cyprès, CYP5620
Steve Reich: Drumming, Cyprès, CYP5608
Terry Riley: In C, Cyprès 5601
Jonathan Harvey: Wheel of Emptiness, Cyprès, CYP5604
Georges Aperghis: Die Hamletmaschine – Oratorio, Cyprès, CYP5607
: Melencholia si..., Sub Rosa, Unclassical, SR179
Benoît Mernier: Les Idées Heureuses, Cyprès, CYP4613

References

External links
 

Contemporary classical music ensembles
Belgian orchestras
Musical groups established in 1994
1994 establishments in Belgium